The 2021–22 season is Ulster Rugby's 29th season since the advent of professionalism in rugby union. They are competing in the United Rugby Championship and the European Rugby Champions Cup. It is Dan McFarland's fifth season as head coach.

They have a new defence coach, Jonny Bell, returning to his home province from a spell at Worcester Warriors, in place of the departing Jared Payne. New signings include Irish-qualified flanker Sean Reffell, from Saracens, lock Frank Bradshaw Ryan from French club Nevers, out-half Jake Flannery from Munster, former All-Black tighthead prop Jeffery Toomaga-Allen from Wasps, and fullback Shea O'Brien from City of Armagh RFC, on a development contract. Hooker Declan Moore, who was signed as temporary injury cover from Munster last season, made his move to Ulster permanent. After the collapse of Worcester Warriors, Scotland and Lions international loosehead prop Rory Sutherland joined until the end of the season.

Ten Ulster players were selected for the Emerging Ireland tour to South Africa for the Toyota Challenge at the end of September: wings Robert Baloucoune and Ethan McIlroy; centre Stewart Moore; out-half Jake Flannery; scrum-halves Nathan Doak and Michael McDonald; loosehead prop Callum Reid; hooker Tom Stewart; lock Cormac Izuchukwu; and flanker David McCann.

The team opened the season with a 36-10 home victory over Connacht in the URC. Hooker Tom Stewart made his first senior start, scored a try and was named Player of the Match. After a high-scoring away win against Scarlets, in which John Cooney scored 30 points, Ulster lost at home to Leinster in heavy rain. There followed a 47-17 win over Ospreys, in which Luke Marshall and Sam Carter scored two tries each. Ulster then became the first northern hemisphere team to win in South Africa this season, beating the Lions in Johannesburg. Their next match, against the Sharks in Durban, was postponed an outbreak of E. coli and norovirus meant they were unable to field a team. Ulster narrowly beat Munster away, with Rory Sutherland making his debut and John Andew making his 100th appearance for the province, both off the bench, and went into the international break second in the URC table.

Eight Ulster players were called up to the Ireland squad for the 2022 end-of-year internationals: Robert Baloucoune, Rob Herring, Michael Lowry, Stuart McCloskey, Tom O'Toole, Jacob Stockdale, Nick Timoney and Kieran Treadwell. Two more, James Hume and Marty Moore, were selected for the panel for Ireland 'A' to play a New Zealand XV.

After the international break, Ulster had a comfortable home win over Zebre Parma, with Tom Stewart scoring two tries. They then travelled to Leinster, and led the league leaders at half time, before Leinster fought back to win the game 38-29. This began a three-game losing streak, as Ulster lost their opening two games in the Champions Cup. After poor weather caused travel disruption, they capitulated 39-0 away to Sale Sharks. A frozen pitch at Ravenhill meant Ulster's home game against reigning champions La Rochelle had to be relocated to Dublin's Aviva Stadium at the last minute, with the match played behind closed doors. La Rochelle built a 29-0 half-time lead, but Ulster improved enough in the second half to earn two bonus points in a 29-36 defeat. Returning to the URC, Ulster halted their losing streak with a close away win against Connacht, featuring another two-try display from Tom Stewart. After last-minute defeats to Munster (during which tighthead prop Marty Moore's season was ended by an anterior cruciate ligament injury) and Benetton in the URC and La Rochelle in the Champions Cup, Ulster secured qualification for the last 16 of the Champions Cup with a home win over Sale. They reached the Six Nations break with a bonus point home win against the Stormers, sitting at third in the URC table and second in the Irish shield.

Five Ulster players were called up to the initial Ireland squad for the 2023 Six Nations Championship: Iain Henderson, Rob Herring, Tom O'Toole, Stuart McCloskey and Jacob Stockdale. Tom Stewart was later added to the squad as cover for the injured Ronan Kelleher, and Nick Timoney was added to the squad ahead of the fourth match against Scotland.

During the Six Nations, Ulster had three consecutive away games, losing to Glasgow Warriors but gaining bonus point wins against the Sharks and Cardiff.

Signings announced for next season include South African prop Steven Kitshoff, from the Stormers, and flanker Dave Ewers, from Exeter Chiefs.

Staff

Squad

Senior squad

Players in
 Sean Reffell from  Saracens
 Jude Postlethwaite promoted from Academy 
 Declan Moore from  Munster
 Frank Bradshaw Ryan from  Nevers 
 Shea O'Brien from  Armagh 
 Jake Flannery from  Munster
 Jeffery Toomaga-Allen from  Wasps
 Michael McDonald from  Western Force
 Rory Sutherland from  Worcester Warriors

Players out
 Bradley Roberts to  Dragons 
 Ross Kane to  Ealing Trailfinders 
 David O'Connor to  Ealing Trailfinders 
 Mick Kearney released
 Jack McGrath released
 Sean Reidy released

Academy squad

Players in
  Joe Hopes from Regent House
  Lorcan McLoughlin from QUB
  James McNabney from Cambridge House
  Rory Telfer from Coleraine Grammar School
  Scott Wilson from Wallace High School.

Players out
  Lewis Finlay to  Ampthill
  Azur Allison
  Conor Rankin to  Ampthill

Pre-season
Defence coach Jared Payne left at the end of the previous season, replaced by Worcester Warriors defence coach, and former Ulster and Ireland centre, Jonny Bell.

New signings include Irish-qualified flanker Sean Reffell from Saracens; hooker Declan Moore, who joined from Munster last season as short-term injury cover, signed with Ulster for the next two seasons; lock Frank Bradshaw Ryan from French club Nevers; fullback Shea O'Brien from City of Armagh RFC, on a development contract; and out-half Jake Flannery from Munster. Academy centre Jude Postlethwaite signed a development contract, to be upgraded to a full senior contract after a year.

Departures include hooker Bradley Roberts to Dragons and prop Ross Kane to Ealing Trailfinders. Prop Jack McGrath, flanker Sean Reidy and locks David O'Connor and Mick Kearney were released.

Ulster's pre-season campaign opened on 2 September with a home friendly against Exeter Chiefs, which they won 31-12. Jacob Stockdale scored a try on his return from injury, and new scrum-half Michael McDonald was named man of the match.

A second friendly, away to Glasgow Warriors, arranged  for 9 September, was cancelled following the death of Queen Elizabeth II the day before.

2022–23 European Rugby Champions Cup

Group stage

Round of 16

2022–23 United Rugby Championship

Ulster 'A'

Notes

References

2022-23
2022–23 in Irish rugby union
2022–23 United Rugby Championship by team
2022–23 European Rugby Champions Cup by team